The following table lists Mexico's 32 federated entities, ranked by total continental surface.

See also
Geography of Mexico
List of Mexican states by population
List of Mexican states by population density
List of states of Mexico
Mexico
Ranked list of Mexican states

References

Area
Mexico, area